Hårlev is a railway town with a population of 2,865 (1 January 2022) in Stevns Municipality on the southeastern part of the Danish island of Zealand about 12 kilometres south of Køge.

Overview
Hårlev was in Bjæverskov Hundred (Danish: "Herred")

Until 1 January 2007 Hårlev was the site of the municipal council of the former Vallø Municipality.

Geography
The town is located where the railroad Østbanen from Køge become divided into two lines, a southeastern line to Store Heddinge and Rødvig and a southern line to Faxe Ladeplads.

References

External links

Stevns Municipality
Cities and towns in Region Zealand